Plexippoides regius is a jumping spider species in the genus Plexippoides. The species was first named by Wanda Wesołowska in 1981 as a Nomen nudum, although it has been subsequently described from specimens found in China, Korea and Russia.

See also
 Wikispecis entry

References

Fauna of Korea
Salticidae
Spiders of Asia
Spiders of China
Spiders of Russia
Taxa named by Wanda Wesołowska
Spiders described in 1981